W200 may refer to:

 Sony Cyber-shot DSC-W200, a point-and-shoot digital camera released in 2007
 Sony Ericsson W200, a cellphone released in 2007